Concordia Parish School Board is a school district headquartered in Concordia Parish, Louisiana, United States.

The district serves residents of Concordia Parish, i.e. Vidalia, Ferriday, Ridgecrest, and Monterey.

School uniforms
The district requires all students to wear school uniforms.

Schools

Pre-Kindergarten - 12 schools
 Monterey High School  (Unincorporated area)
Concordia Parish Academy of Math, Science, and Technology (Ridgecrest)

High schools
 Ferriday High School  (Ferriday)
 Vidalia High School  (Vidalia)

Junior high schools
 Ferriday Junior High School (Ferriday)
 Vidalia Junior High School (Vidalia)

Elementary schools
3 - 5
 Ferriday Upper Elementary School (Ferriday)
 Vidalia Upper Elementary School (Vidalia)

Pre-Kindergarten - 2
 Ferriday Lower Elementary School (Ferriday)
 Vidalia Lower Elementary School (Vidalia)

Alternative schools
 Concordia Education Center (Ferriday)

References

External links
 Concordia Parish School Board
 Concordia Parish School Board
 [Student Accounts]

School districts in Louisiana
Education in Concordia Parish, Louisiana